Kranjče is a small settlement in the hills northeast of Begunje in the Municipality of Cerknica in the Inner Carniola region of Slovenia.

Geography

Kranjče is bounded to the southwest by Mrzlek Creek, which separates the village's territory from neighboring Dolenje Otave. Gora Falls, named after the neighboring village of Gora, is located along the creek.

References

External links

Kranjče on Geopedia

Populated places in the Municipality of Cerknica